Takkay ki Ayegi Baraat is a Pakistani comedy-drama that aired on Geo TV from June 2011 to October 2011. The third instalment of its kind, it is a continuation of the hit Dolly ki Ayegi Baraat in the Evernew's popular storyline of Kis Ki Ayegi Baraat. The show includes most of the characters from Dolly ki Ayegi Baraat, and focuses on the story of Mustaq a.k.a. Takkay and Sila's friend Sukena. Takkay ki Ayegi Baraat is written by Vasay Chaudry who had co written the previous serial as well. The character of Sila, previously played by Sarwat Gilani and Ayesha Omar in the first and second serials respectively, is played by Alishba Yousuf. This is the third time the character of Sila has been played by a different actress. And the character of Azar (played by Hassan Niazi in the previous two serials) is now played by Ahsan Khan.

Plot
Set around three months after Nabeel & Dolly's marriage. Sukki and Mushtaq have taken their relationship further and now have confessed to their parents to arrange their marriage. However things are not gone be as easy as they thought as sukki’s mom has kept a condition that quiet impossible for Mushtaq and his family to accept. Mustaq's legitimate education certificate.

Meanwhile, Faraz is on search of someone to finance his directional debut feature film, and the only guy he finds, wants to marry Rabia's mom.Rabia’s mom and Sila try to convince Rabia to forget an event from her past. While Azar suffers from finding his job after losing his job when his boss fired him for not doing the wrong thing,Vicky needs to decide what he wants to do with his life & what are his feelings for Laila. In the end everything goes well and Mushtaq and Sukki are married happily.

Cast
 Ali Safina as Mushtaq Mela (Taka)
 Uroosa Siddiqui as Sukaina Mela (Sukhi)
 Bushra Ansari as Saima Chaudhry
 Saba Hameed as Rabia Ahmed
 Samina Ahmad as Mehr Un Nisa 
 Javed Sheikh as Faraz ahmad
 Shehryar Zaidi as Chaudhry Nazeer Ahmed
 Ahsan Khan as Azar Chaudry
 Alishba Yousuf as Sila Chaudry
 Sumbul Shahid as Mushtaq's mother	
 Sana Askari as Laila 
 Natasha Ali as Dolly 
 Huma Hameed as Arfa
 Naveen Waqar as Annie
 Yasir Ali Khan as Adeel
 Bindiya as Sukaina's mother
 Raheel Butt as Nabeel 
 Sohail Asghar as Mushtaq's uncle
 Reema Khan as Reema
 Manzoor Qureshi as Khalid Bhanji
 Azra Mohyeddin as Mehr's friend
 Asad Siddiqui as Vicky Chaudry
 Marina Khan as Dr Fariha Hashim

Location
The current series have been shot in Karachi & Faisalabad in accordance with the previous series. A preview of the Karachi Fashion Week was also shown in the first episode.

Soundtrack
The title song was sung by Shazia Manzoor & Raju from the band Rhythm And Bhangra (RNB) & four promotional videos was advertised on GEO. The song titled Chan Makhna is said to be medley of Shazia's popular song Chan Makhna & Wari Warsi (another popular song that has been sung in many version across India & Pakistan). The promotional video featured the complete cast of the drama except Manzoor Qureshi. The complete song was featured in Episode 16 of the serial & featured special appearance from Reema Khan to promote her film Love Mein Ghum. Meera also appeared for a guest appearance in the song.

Reception
Takkay ki ayegi baraat received more 18,000 likes on Facebook & received a rating of 4.5/5 from TVKahani.com which praised the acting of Manzoor Qureshi & Bushra Ansari, but criticized a weaker plot as compared to Dolly ki ayegi baraat & the low limelight bestowed upon characters like Dolly, Azar, Sila, & Rabia, in the next season this problem was improved, because of Immense popularity the whole series was  also aired in India on channel Zee Zindagi.

Sequel
TV Kahani stated that due to the highest ratings achieved by Takkay Ki Ayegi Baraat on GEO, EVERNEW has also made a sequel Annie Ki Ayegi Baraat which has weddings of Laila with Vikky, Nani with Khalid Bhanji and Annie with Mikaal.

Awards and nominations 
 11th Lux Style Awards-Best TV Actor - Satellite-Ali Safina-Nominated
 11th Lux Style Awards-Best TV Play - Satellite-Nominated

References

Pakistani television series
Comedy-drama television series
Geo TV original programming
2011 Pakistani television series debuts
Pakistani drama television series
Urdu-language television shows
Zee Zindagi original programming